Todd Nauck is an American comic book artist and writer. Nauck is most notable for his work on Friendly Neighborhood Spider-Man, Young Justice and his own creation, Wildguard.

Career
Nauck's first assignment from Marvel Comics was writing, penciling and inking "Mutant Mishaps", a story that was published on the back cover of What The--?! #21 (September 1992). He subsequently wrote and illustrated the "Mutant Mishaps" story that appeared in What The--? #25 (Summer 1993).

In early 1994, Todd was hired by Rob Liefeld's Extreme Studios  of Image Comics  when a friend from art school showed his WildGuard work to Dan Fraga at a comic book convention, who in turn showed it to Liefeld, which led to Nauck's first Image work. Nauck went on to draw such series as Badrock and Co., New Men, New Force, Supreme, Youngblood and Team Youngblood. By 1997, Nauck began work with DC Comics. After drawing several Legion of Superheroes stories, he helped launch the Young Justice  series with writer Peter David. Nauck drew 53 issues of the 55 issue run of the series, including three double-sized issues and a portion of the Young Justice/Spyboy crossover mini-series.

Nauck published his creator-owned series, Wildguard, with Image Comics. The series was patterned after a reality television show competition, in which various wannabe superheroes competed for a spot on a new superhero team, and judged by a panel of judges, as on the television series American Idol.

Nauck's other work includes Teen Titans (Volume 3) #32-33, Teen Titans Go!, Friendly Neighborhood Spider-Man #11-13 and 17-23, American Dream #1-5, Spider-Man: the Clone Saga #1-6, Amazing Spider-Man #628 and the covers for X-Campus #1-4.

Nauck was the artist of the much-publicized five-page back-up story that appeared in The Amazing Spider-Man #583, which was published in January 2009, and featured a cameo appearance by then-President-elect Barack Obama.

Nauck's art was featured in the  eighth season finale of the reality television show Extreme Makeover: Home Edition, which aired May 15, 2011. In the episode, he and colorist John Rauch, on behalf of Marvel Custom Solutions, designed life-sized Marvel Comics superheroes on the bedroom wall of the show's beneficiary, Patrick Sharrock, a 9-year-old boy with brittle bone disease, and depicted Sharrock himself as a superhero named Dr. Scorcher. They also provided similar art for the episode's scene transitions, which depicted Ty Pennington, Xzibit, and the rest of the show's cast as superheroes as well.

Nauck would continue his work with Marvel Custom Solutions, teaming with writer C. B. Cebulski and kitchenware retailer Williams Sonoma to raise awareness of child hunger for Share Our Strength in Spider-Man and the Avengers #1. The twelve-page story features Edwin Jarvis hosting a cooking demonstration interrupted by the Frightful Four.

In 2012, Nauck signed on with Robert Kirkman's Skybound Entertainment at Image Comics to draw the second volume of the Invincible spin-off series, Guarding the Globe, which ran for six issues before relaunching in 2013 as Invincible Universe which ran for twelve issues. 

In 2018, Nauck joined Dark Horse Comics to draw the six mini-series Mystery Science Theater 3000: The Comic, drawing the "host segments" of the comic.

References

External links

1971 births
American comics artists
Living people